Gene Breen is a former linebacker in the National Football League (NFL).

Biography
Breen was born Joseph Eugene Breen on June 21, 1941 in Crafton, Pennsylvania.

Career
Breen was drafted by the Green Bay Packers in the fifteenth round of the 1963 NFL Draft and played with the team during the 1964 NFL season. He had also been drafted in the sixteenth round of the 1963 AFL Draft by the San Diego Chargers. Following his time with the Packers, he played two seasons with the Pittsburgh Steelers and two seasons with the Los Angeles Rams. 

He played defensive line at the collegiate level for Virginia Tech and was awarded All Southern Conference honors.  He also wrestled at Virginia Tech, where he won the Southern Conference Championship at Heavyweight division.  Breen was elected to the Virginia Tech Sports Hall of Fame in 2004.

See also
List of Green Bay Packers players
List of Pittsburgh Steelers players

References

1941 births
Living people
People from Crafton, Pennsylvania
Green Bay Packers players
Pittsburgh Steelers players
Los Angeles Rams players
American football linebackers
Virginia Tech alumni
Virginia Tech Hokies football players
Players of American football from Pennsylvania